Incheon Football Stadium, also known as Sungui Arena Park, is a football-specific stadium in Incheon, South Korea. The stadium is currently used mostly for football matches and is the home ground of Incheon United of the K League. The stadium was designed with a capacity of 20,891 spectators. It replaced the much larger Incheon Munhak Stadium. On 11 March 2012, Incheon United officially had its first game since the opening of the stadium on the same day, when they played against Suwon Samsung Bluewings. It was chosen to host matches at the Group and Round of 16 stages of the 2017 FIFA U-20 World Cup.

References

External links
 Stadium information
 Word Stadiums 

Football venues in South Korea
Sports venues in Incheon
Incheon United FC
Venues of the 2014 Asian Games
Asian Games football venues
Sports venues completed in 2012
K League 1 stadiums